New Hope is an unincorporated community in Morgan County in the U.S. state of West Virginia's Eastern Panhandle. New Hope lies at the confluence of Yellow Spring Run and Sleepy Creek.

References

Unincorporated communities in Morgan County, West Virginia
Unincorporated communities in West Virginia